The Paup P-Craft is an American ultralight aircraft that was designed by D. Paup and produced by Paup Aircraft, introduced in 1982. The aircraft was supplied as a kit for amateur construction.

Design and development
It features a strut-braced high-wing, a single-seat, open cockpit, conventional landing gear and a single engine in pusher configuration.

The aircraft is made from aluminum tubing, with the aft fuselage welded steel tubing. Its tapered  span wing has no wing-mounted control surfaces. The wing is covered in doped aircraft fabric. Pitch is controlled conventionally, while yaw is controlled by the rudder, actuated by sideways movement of the control stick. The high degree of wing dihedral produces rolling motion from yaw coupling. The landing gear is bungee-suspended and the tailwheel is steerable. The single cylinder, two-stroke Cuyuna 215  engine is mounted behind the open pilot's seat, with the propeller rotating in between the top and bottom tail structural members.

Specifications (P-Craft)

References

External links
Image of P-Craft

1980s United States ultralight aircraft
Homebuilt aircraft
Single-engined pusher aircraft
High-wing aircraft